In Greek mythology, Harpina (Ancient Greek: Άρπινα) was a Naiad nymph and daughter of Phliasian Asopus and of Metope.

Mythology 
According to the tradition of the Eleans and Phliasians, Ares mated with Harpina in the city of Pisa (located in the ancient Greek region of Elis) and she bore him Oenomaus, the king of Pisa. The latter founded and named after his mother the city of Harpina, not far from the river Harpinates, near Olympia. Pausanias mentions Harpina in his description of a group sculpture, donated by the Phliasians, of the daughters of Asopus, which included Nemea, Zeus seizing Aegina, Harpina, Corcyra, Thebe and Asopus. The sculpture was located in the sanctuary of Hippodamia at Olympia.

Notes

References
 Diodorus Siculus, The Library of History translated by Charles Henry Oldfather. Twelve volumes. Loeb Classical Library. Cambridge, Massachusetts: Harvard University Press; London: William Heinemann, Ltd. 1989. Vol. 3. Books 4.59–8. Online version at Bill Thayer's Web Site
 Diodorus Siculus, Bibliotheca Historica. Vol 1-2. Immanel Bekker. Ludwig Dindorf. Friedrich Vogel. in aedibus B. G. Teubneri. Leipzig. 1888-1890. Greek text available at the Perseus Digital Library.
 Pausanias, Description of Greece with an English Translation by W.H.S. Jones, Litt.D., and H.A. Ormerod, M.A., in 4 Volumes. Cambridge, MA, Harvard University Press; London, William Heinemann Ltd. 1918. . Online version at the Perseus Digital Library
 Pausanias, Graeciae Descriptio. 3 vols. Leipzig, Teubner. 1903.  Greek text available at the Perseus Digital Library.
 Smith, William, Dictionary of Greek and Roman Geography, 1854. "Harpina".

Naiads
Nymphs
Children of Asopus
Women of Ares
el:Άρπινα (αρχαία πόλη)